Audrey Elizabeth Nicoll (née Gibb; born 1961) is a Scottish politician who has been the Member of the Scottish Parliament (MSP) for Aberdeen South and North Kincardine since 2021. A member of the Scottish National Party (SNP), she has represented the Torry/Ferryhill ward in the Aberdeen City Council since 2019

Early life 
Nicoll was born Audrey Gibb in Aberdeen. She worked as a detective sergeant police officer in both uniformed and specialist roles, retiring in 2015. After retiring, she gave lectures in the School of Nursing, Midwifery and Paramedic Practice at Robert Gordon University.

Political career
On 21 November 2019 she was elected to Aberdeen City Council in the by-election for the Torry/Ferryhill ward.

On 7 May 2021 in the 2021 Scottish Parliament election she was elected as Member of the Scottish Parliament (MSP) for Aberdeen South and North Kincardine.

Personal life 
Nicoll is married to Alex Nicoll, the SNP's group leader in Aberdeen.

References

External links 
 
 profile at Aberdeen City Council

1961 births
Living people
Scottish police officers
Councillors in Aberdeen
Scottish National Party MSPs
Members of the Scottish Parliament 2021–2026
Female members of the Scottish Parliament
Scottish National Party councillors
Women councillors in Scotland
Officers in Scottish police forces